Regina Obedapo "Gina" Iyashere is a British comedian, actress and writer who has made many appearances on British and American television. She co-created the sitcom Bob Hearts Abishola, on which she plays a supporting role.

Early life 
Yashere was born and raised in Bethnal Green London to Nigerian parents. Before becoming a comedian, she worked as a lift maintenance technician and engineer (the company's first female to do so, all of which she mentions in her stand-up routine).

She uses the surname "Yashere" due to encountering common mispronunciation of her original surname.

Career 
Yashere was a finalist in the Hackney Empire New Act of the Year competition in 1996. She has appeared in a number of television programmes, including in the comedy series The Lenny Henry Show, where she played Tanya and Mrs Omokorede, the pushy mum. She voiced Keisha on the animated series Bromwell High. In 2005, she appeared on the reality television series Comic Relief does Fame Academy, in aid of Comic Relief, and she co-hosted the 2006 and 2007 MOBO Awards alongside 2Baba and Coolio. She has made numerous appearances on Mock the Week, and appeared on the CBBC show Gina's Laughing Gear.

In 2007, Yashere was featured on the reality show Last Comic Standing, auditioning in Sydney. She was among the ten finalists, but on 1 August 2007, she and Dante were the first two finalists eliminated.

In 2008, she became the first Briton to perform on Def Comedy Jam. On 3 September 2009, she appeared on The Tonight Show with Conan O'Brien and performed a stand-up comedy routine. On 24 December, she appeared on Live at the Apollo. She appeared twice on the short-lived primetime show The Jay Leno Show: on 21 October 2009, a video of Yashere showed her giving free fortune-telling readings to passers-by, and on 25 November 2009, she operated a walk-in psychic booth. Starting in 2010, she appeared semi-regularly on The Tonight Show with Jay Leno, in a sketch comedy series called Madame Yashere: The Surly Psychic.

In 2010, Yashere appeared as Flo in several episodes of the ITV drama Married Single Other. In April 2010, her one-hour comedy special, Skinny B*tch, premiered on Showtime, a US cable channel. She appeared on Watch TV show Scream If You Know the Answer with contestant Emily Green from Portsmouth. She helped Green win the show with a prize fund of £2,000. In 2013, Yashere appeared in an advert for Tesco Mobile. In 2015, she was featured as a selected comic on Gotham Comedy Live, which airs on AXS TV (season 4-Judah Friedlander) where she referred to the City of Cleveland, Ohio as "shit." On 8 January 2016, she appeared on The Nasty Show with Artie Lange, which aired on Showtime.

Starting on 16 March 2017, Yashere began a brief stint as the British correspondent for The Daily Show.

In September 2019, Yashere began appearing in a supporting role on the 2019 Chuck Lorre CBS sitcom, Bob Hearts Abishola, which Lorre created with Yashere. Yashere writes for the show and plays Folake Olowofoyeku's character Abishola's best friend, Kemi. Bob Hearts Abishola is the first American sitcom to feature a Nigerian family.

Personal life 
Yashere is lesbian. She currently lives in Altadena, California, with her partner Nina Rose Fischer.

Filmography 
Below is an incomplete filmography:

Film

Television

References

External links 

 
 
 

Living people
Year of birth missing (living people)
20th-century English comedians
21st-century English comedians
Black British women comedians
English expatriates in the United States
English film actresses
English people of Nigerian descent
English stand-up comedians
English television actresses
Last Comic Standing contestants
LGBT Black British people
Lesbian comedians
People from Bethnal Green
20th-century English women
20th-century English people
21st-century English women
British LGBT comedians